Gary Guy (born 12 July 1952) is a former Australian rules footballer who played with Melbourne in the Victorian Football League (VFL) and Dandenong VFA .

Notes

References
 
 Green, Laura, "Couple celebrates 70 year anniversary", The Bayside News, Monday, 20 July, 2020.

External links 

1952 births
Living people
Australian rules footballers from Victoria (Australia)
Melbourne Football Club players